Florentine Mulsant (born 27 March 1962) is a French composer.

Life 
Born in Dakar, Mulsant studied harmony, counterpoint, fugue, musical analysis and orchestration at the Conservatoire de Paris and the Schola Cantorum de Paris, where she won a First Prize in 1987 for composition in Allain Gaussin's class. She followed the teaching of Franco Donatoni at the Accademia Musicale Chigiana and furthered her skill with Alain Bancquart.

Selected works 
 Amer, for piano, on a poem by Saint-John Perse, Op. 4
 Sonate de concert, for violin, Op. 19
 Sonate for viola and piano, Op. 20 (1999)
 Sonate for violin and piano, Op. 21 (1999/2000)
 In jubilo, quartet for clarinet, violin, cello and piano, Op. 22
 Trio for violin, cello and piano, Op. 23
 Quatuor à cordes, Op. 26 (Commission by Radio France, premiered by the Castagneri Quartet, 2004)
 Sonate for cello, Op. 27
 Quatuor avec piano, Op. 28
 Passacaille for piano, Op. 29
 Quintette à vent, Op. 30

Bibliography

External links 
 Personal website
 "Florentine Mulsant, compositeur", Isabelle Perrin, on ResMusica, 18 January 2006, (read online)
 Florentine Mulsant - Dédale (YouTube)

1962 births
Living people
People from Dakar
Conservatoire de Paris alumni
Schola Cantorum de Paris alumni
French classical composers
French women classical composers
French music educators
Women music educators
Chevaliers of the Ordre des Arts et des Lettres
20th-century classical composers
20th-century French composers
20th-century women composers
21st-century classical composers
21st-century women composers